Brenda Lucki  is a Canadian police officer who previously served as the 24th commissioner of the Royal Canadian Mounted Police from April 2018 to March 2023. She is the first woman to permanently hold the position.

By virtue of her role, Lucki was the ex-officio Principal Commander of the Order of Merit of the Police Forces.

Early life and education 
Lucki was born in 1966 and raised in Edmonton, Alberta. She graduated from the University of Alberta with a Bachelor of Arts degree.

Police career 
In 1986, she joined the Royal Canadian Mounted Police (RCMP). Throughout her career, she has served in numerous provinces in Canada, to include: Quebec, Ontario, Manitoba, Saskatchewan and Alberta.

From 1993 to 1994, she served on the United Nations Protection Force in the former Yugoslavia.

Lucki's other appointments and postings included the RCMP's peacekeeping program in Ottawa in 1995, and she was appointed to Commandant of the RCMP Academy, Depot Division in 2017.

Lucki was appointed RCMP Commissioner in 2018 by the government of Justin Trudeau, following the retirement of Commissioner Bob Paulson.

On February 15, 2023, Lucki announced her retirement as a personal decision, effective March 17. On March 17, it was accounted that Michael Duheme would serve as interim commissioner until the appointment of a permanent successor.

2022 invocation of Emergencies Act 
On May 11, 2022, Lucki stated under oath to the Special Joint Committee on the Declaration of Emergency (DECD) that "while her agency was consulted, it never requested nor recommended the [Emergencies Act]'s use."  The Senate and the House of Commons agreed to strike this committee to investigate the events associated with invocation of the Emergencies Act in the wake of the 2022 Freedom Convoy to Parliament Hill.

Criticism 
Lucki has been subject to a number of criticisms in her role as police commissioner.

Systemic racism in policing 
In June 2020, Lucki was criticized for her explanation of systemic racism in the force, when she compared it to height. She later admitted she “struggled” with the concept of systemic racism, and dismissed allegations of the RCMP holding racial biases different from any other organization.

Lucki later commented that she better understood the concept of systemic racism and how it might exist within the RCMP.

Spying on climate activists 
In January 2022, a Canadian federal court ruled Lucki breached duty by failing to respond to a watchdog report on the alleged spying on anti-oil protestors.

Alleged political interference in the Nova Scotia mass murder investigation 
On June 21, 2022, the Halifax Examiner published an article alleging that—at the onset of the 2020 Nova Scotia mass murder investigation—Lucki promised Public Safety Minister Bill Blair and the Prime Minister’s Office to leverage the murders to get a gun control law passed. The article alleges that Lucki pressured the RCMP to release details of the murder weapons despite the insistence of RCMP commanders that releasing this information might jeopardize the investigation.

Awards and decorations
Lucki's personal awards and decorations received during her policing career include the following:

110px

110px

References 

Royal Canadian Mounted Police commissioners
Living people
University of Alberta alumni
People from Edmonton
Canadian women police officers
1966 births